The Inside Film Awards (now known as the IF Awards) is an annual awards ceremony and broadcast platform for the Australian film industry, developed by the creators of Inside Film Magazine, Stephen Jenner and David Barda, and originally produced for television by Australian Producer Andrew Dillon. The awards are determined by a national audience poll, which differentiates it from the Australian AACTA Awards, which are judged by industry professionals.

The event is held in November each year, and is broadcast on SBS television and showtime movie channels. The IF Awards were first held in 1999, and until 2006 were also known as the Lexus Inside Film Awards, in recognition of its principal sponsor Lexus. Sponsorship since then has included multiple broadcast and event partners, with the new naming rights partner for 2011 being Jameson Irish Whiskey. In 2011, the Jameson IF Awards were held in November in Sydney again.

As of 2012, the IF Awards have been 'on hold'.

2007 nominations
The IF Award for Best Feature Film
The Home Song Stories – directed by Tony Ayres and produced by Michael McMahon & Liz Watts
The Jammed – directed by Dee McLachlan and produced by Sally Ayre–Smith, Andrea Buck & Dee McLachlan
Lucky Miles – directed by Michael James Rowland and produced by Jo Dyer & Lesley Dyer

The Animal Logic IF Award for Best Director
Tony Ayres – The Home Song Stories
Matthew Saville – Noise
Kriv Stenders – Boxing Day

The Queensland Events Corporation IF Award for Best Actor
Brendan Cowell – Noise
Richard Green – Boxing Day
Joel Lok – The Home Song Stories

The In Style IF Award for Best Actress
Brenda Blethyn – Clubland
Joan Chen – The Home Song Stories
Veronica Sywak –The Jammed

The Kodak IF Award for Best Cinematography
The Home Song Stories – Nigel Bluck
The Jammed – Peter Falk
Lucky Miles – Geoff Burton, ASC.

The IF Award for Best Music
The Home Song Stories – Antony Partos
The Jammed – Grant Innes McLachlan
Noise – Bryony Marks

The Australian Film Commission IF Award for Best Script
The Jammed – Dee McLachlan
The Home Song Stories – Tony Ayres
Lucky Miles – Michael James Rowland & Helen Barnes

The Holding Redlich IF Award for Best Short Film
Crocodile Dreaming – Directed by Darlene Johnson & produced by Sue Milliken
Nana – Directed by Warwick Thornton & produced by Kath Shelper
Soul Mates – Directed by Naomi Rossdeutscher & produced by Rachel Clements and Paul Howard

The Lab Sydney IF Award for Best Short Animation
The Goat That Ate Time – Directed & produced by Lucinda Schreiber
Richard – Directed & produced by Mick Elliott
Sweet & Sour – Directed by Eddie White & produced by Sam White and The People's Republic of Animation

The SBS IF Award for Best Short Documentary
Flour, Sugar, Tea – Directed by Lee Willis & produced by Gina Twyble
My Brother Vinnie – Directed by Steven McGregor & produced by Sarah Bond
Nigger Lovers – Directed by Rhonda Hagan & produced by Daryl Sparkes & Stephen Hagan

The IF Award for Best Documentary
Bomb Harvest – Directed by Kim Mordaunt & produced by Sylvia Wilczynski
4 – Directed by Tim Slade & produced by Joanna Buggy
Unlikely Travellers – Directed by Michael Noonan & produced by Michael Noonan and John Hart

The 3 IF Award for Best Music Video
God Told Me To – Directed by Natasha Pincus. Artist: Paul Kelly
Heart's A Mess – Directed by Brendan Cook. Artist: Gotye
I Thought About You – Directed by Kiku Ohe. Artist: The Beautiful Girls

The Production Book IF Award for Best Production Design
Clubland – Nell Hanson
The Home Song Stories – Melinda Doring
Lucky Miles – Pete Baxter

The Cutting Edge IF Award for Best Editing
The Jammed – Anne Carter & Dee McLachlan
Lucky Miles – Henry Dangar, ASE
Noise – Geoff Hitchins

The Zig Zag Lane IF Award for Best Sound
Clubland – Liam Egan, Ian McLoughlin, Andrew Neil & Steven Jackson Vaughan
The Home Song Stories – Craig Carter, John Wilkinson, James Harvey & Andrew Neil
Noise – Emma Bortignon, Doron Kipen & Philippe Decrausaz

The Independent Spirit IF Award
Cross Life – Claire McCarthy
Searching 4 Sandeep – Poppy Stockell
Darling! The Pieter–Dirk Uys Story – Julian Shaw

The Atlab IF Award for Rising Talent
Philippa Campey
Bonnie Elliott
Ben Hackworth
Erin White

ZTudio What IF? Award for Best Unproduced Screenplay
The Adventures of Abigail Storm – Luke Preston
The Farm – Peter Dai Evans
Intersection – Robin de Crespigny

2008 nominees

(winners in each category are listed first, with nominees in alphabetical order following):

SHOWTIME IF Award for Best Feature Film
Men's Group- Michael Joy & John L. Simpson
The Black Balloon - Elissa Down & Tristram Miall
Son of a Lion - Benjamin Gilmour & Carolyn Johnson

Screen Australia IF Award for Best Director
PETER DUNCAN - Unfinished Sky
Elissa Down - The Black Balloon
Andrew Traucki & David Nerlich - Black Water

Queensland Events Corporation IF Award for Best Actor
GRANT DODWELL - Men's Group
Rhys Wakefield - The Black Balloon
William McInnes - Unfinished Sky

IF Award for Best Actress
MONIC HENDRICKX - Unfinished Sky
Gemma Ward - The Black Balloon
Maeve Dermody - Black Water

Screen Australia IF Award for Best Script
Men's Group - Michael Joy & John L. Simpson
The Black Balloon - Elissa Down & Jimmy The Exploder
Unfinished Sky - Peter Duncan

Sony IF Award for Best Cinematography
JULES O'LOUGHLIN ACS - September
Denson Baker ACS - The Black Balloon
Robert Humphreys ACS - Unfinished Sky

Dinosaur Designs IF Award for Best Music
AMANDA BROWN - Son of a Lion
Michael Yezerski - The Black Balloon
Haydn Walker - Men's Group

Cutting Edge IF Award for Best Editing
SURESH AYYAR - Unfinished Sky
Veronika Jenet ASE - The Black Balloon
Rodrigo Balart - Black Water

The Production Book IF Award for Best Production Design
LAURIE FAEN - Unfinished Sky
Nicholas McCallum - The Black Balloon
Sam Hobbs - September

The Zig Zag Lane IF Award for Best Sound
SAM PETTY, ROB MACKENZIE, YULIA AKERHOLT, PETER GRACE & MICHAEL MCMENOMY - The Square
Paul Pirola & Ben Osmo - The Black Balloon
Andrew Plain, Annie Breslin, Will Ward & John Scheifelbein - Unfinished Sky

IF Award for Box Office Achievement
The Black Balloon

SBS IF Award for Best Documentary
The Burning Season - Cathy Henkel (director/producer), Jeff Canin (producer) & Trish Lake (producer)
The Oasis - Ian Darling (director/producer) & Sascha Ettinger Epstein (director)
Playing In The Shadows - Sascha Ettinger Epstein (director/producer) & Marco Ianniello (director/producer)

St Arnou IF Award for Best Short Documentary
UNDRESSING VANESSA - Matthew Pond (director) & Tina Lymberis (producer)
Mad Morro - Kelrick Martin (director) & Tom Zubrycki (producer)
Rare Chicken Rescue - Randall Wood (director) & Vickie Gest (producer)

Holding Redlich IF Award for Best Short Film
fOUR - Erin White (director) & Zyra McAuliffe (producer)
Spider - Nash Edgerton (director) & Nicole O'Donohue (producer)
You Better Watch Out - Steve Callen (director) & Jules Callen (producer)

Autodesk IF Award for Best Short Animation
THE COVENANT OF MR KASCH - Joshua Beahan (director/producer) & Ruwan De Silva (director/producer)
Dog With Electric Collar - Steve Baker (director) & Damon Escott (producer)
Mutt - Glen Hunwick (director) & Beth Frey (producer)

3 mobile IF Award for Best Music Video
JUST A BOY BY ANGUS & JULIA STONE - Angus & Julia Stone (directors), Josh Groom (director), Andrew Yoole (director), Madeleine Milasas (producer) & Jodie Passmore (producer)
Emergency! Emergency! by The Hot Lies - Luke Eve (director) & Simon Ritch (producer)
If You Keep Losing Sleep  by Silverchair - Stephen Lance (director), Damon Escott (director) & Leanne Tonkes (producer)

ZTudio What IF? Award for Best Unproduced Screenplay
MEMORIAL DAY - Kieran Darcy-Smith
Get Black - Matthew C Vaughan
Red Light Revolution - Sam Voutas

Efilm IF Award for Rising Talent
LEON FORD
Amy Gebhardt
Cris Jones

Post Op Group IF Award for Independent Spirit
BENJAMIN GILMOUR & CAROLYN JOHNSON - Son of a Lion
Jason Byrne - Rats & Cats
Christopher Weekes - Bitter & Twisted

V Australia IF Award for Living Legend
Hugo Weaving

Inside Film magazine IF Award for Festival of the Year
Flickerfest International Film Festival

Winners of the 2010 Kodak IF Awards

"The AUTODESK IF Award for Best Short Animation"  
 The Lost Thing – Directors: Shaun Tan, Andrew Ruhemann, Producer: Sophie Byrne

The Holding Redlich IF Award for Best Short Film
Celestial Avenue – Directors: Colin & Cameron Cairnes, Producer: Scott Alexander

The FACB IF Award for Best Short Documentary
From Dope to Dalai Lama – Director: Jason Raftopoulos, Producer: Jason Raftopoulos

SBS Best Documentary IF Award
Strange Birds in Paradise – Director: Charlie Hill-Smith, Producer: Jamie Nicolai, John Cherry

The SAE INSTITUTE IF Award for Best Music Video
"Big Jet Plane" - Angus & Julia Stone – Director: Kiku Ohe, Producer: Richard Halstead

The AFTRS IF Award for Best Direction
Animal Kingdom – David Michôd

JAMESON IF Award for Best Script
Tomorrow, When the War Began – Stuart Beattie

Events NSW IF Award for Best Actor
Animal Kingdom – Ben Mendelsohn

The IF Award for Best Actress
Tomorrow, When the War Began – Caitlin Stasey

The SHOWTIME MOVIE CHANNELS IF Award for Best Feature Film
Tomorrow, When the War Began

SA FILM IF Award for Best Sound
Beneath Hill 60 – ROBERT SULLIVAN, LIAM EGAN, MARK CORNISH, TONY MURTAGH

Dinosaur Designs IF Award for Best Music
Tomorrow, When the War Began – JOHNNY KLIMEK, REINHOLD HEIL

CineAlta by Sony IF Award for Best Cinematography
The Waiting City – DENSON BAKER

DYSON IF Award for Best Production Design
Bright Star – Janet Patterson

AVID IF Award for Best Editing
The Waiting City –VERONIKA JENET

National Film and Sound Archive Independent Spirit IF Award
Caught Inside – Directed by Adam Blaiklock, Produced by Paul S Friedman

EFilm IF Award for Rising Talent
Ariel Kleiman

The Media Super Out of the Box IF Award
Ryan Corr

Docklands Studios Melbourne IF Award for Contribution to TV
Penny Chapman

References

External links
Official website 

Australian film awards